The 2007 National Cheerleading Championship is the second season of the National Cheerleading Championship, a cheerleading competition for college and high school teams in the Philippines. It was the first season that had an open qualifiers. The winning teams from the previous season were also given automatic berths in the finals. The qualifiers were held on February 18, 2007, at the Le Pavilion, Metropolitan Park, Pasay, Metro Manila were 13 college teams and 10 high school teams vied for the spots in the finals.

The finals were held on February 25, 2007, at PhilSports Arena, PhilSports Complex, Pasig, Metro Manila with the CCP Bobcats of the Central Colleges of the Philippines and the SSA Seagulls of the School of St. Anthony declared as the champions for the college and high school divisions, respectively.

Qualification
The open qualifiers was held on February 18, 2007, at the Le Pavilion, Metropolitan Park, Pasay, Metro Manila. 13 college teams and 10 high school teams participated in the open qualifiers.

Team placing

Participating teams
College

 UP Pep Squad (University of the Philippines Diliman)
 CCP Bobcats (Central Colleges of the Philippines)
 Mapúa Cardinals (Mapúa Institute of Technology)
 PUP Stars (Polytechnic University of the Philippines)
 Altas Perps Squad (University of Perpetual Help System DALTA)
 EAC Generals Pep Squad (Emilio Aguinaldo College)
 Ateneo Blue Babble Battalion (Ateneo de Cagayan University)

 Adamson Pep Squad (Adamson University)
 
 Lyceum Pep Squad (Lyceum of the Philippines University)
 PWU Wildcats (Philippine Women's University)
 RTU Technocrats (Rizal Technological University)
 The Gray Hawks Pep Squad (Technological University of the Philippines)

High School

 SSA Seagulls Pep Squad (School of Saint Anthony)
 SHS Pep Squad (School of the Holy Spirit)
 San Beda Red Lions (San Beda College Alabang)
 Poveda Hardcourt (St. Pedro Poveda College)
 PCC Pep Squad (Pasig Catholic College)

 AC Hardcourt (Assumption College)
 Stallions Pep Squad (Manuel L. Quezon University High School)
 The CMIC Fighting Vanguards (Children of Mary Immaculate College)
 DLSZ Pep Squad and Cheerdancers (De La Salle Santiago Zobel School)
 Green Jaguars (Manila High School)

College

High school

Finals
The finals were held on February 25, 2007, at PhilSports Arena, PhilSports Complex, Pasig, Metro Manila.

Team placing

College
After the one-day open qualifiers, eight teams qualified for the finals.

High school
Out of the ten teams that vied for the qualification in the competition, seven teams made it to the finals.

References

National Cheerleading Championship
Sports in the Philippines
2007 in Philippine sport